Gornik may refer to one of the following.
Gornik, Pleven Province, a village in Chechen Republic
April Gornik, an American painter
Górnik (means "Miner" in Polish) is a common name of Polish sports teams:
Górnik Konin
Górnik Łęczna
Stadion Górnika, their stadium
Górnik Polkowice
Górnik Radlin
Górnik Wałbrzych
Górnik Wieliczka
Górnik Zabrze

See also
 Hirnyk (disambiguation)
 Gornyak (disambiguation)